Xicalancatl, Xicallancatl or Xicalcoatl (From Nahuatl, 'Teacup Serpent') is one of the six giants sons of Mixcoatl and Tlaltecuhtli that populated the Earth after the Great Flood during the Fifth Sun in Aztec Mythology. The fourth son who settled on the coasts of the Gulf of Mexico, in the region called Xicallanco (from Nahuatl, 'in the region of the teacups or glass of dungeon), which confirms the abundance that there is in that region of such a vegetable product.

References 

Aztec legendary creatures
Native American giants